Leucopholis is a large genus of scarab beetles in the tribe Melolonthini.

Species

Leucopholis aberrans Sharp, 1876
Leucopholis armata Sharp, 1876
Leucopholis bakeri Moser, 1924
Leucopholis brenskei Nonfried, 1906
Leucopholis burmeisteri Brenske, 1894
Leucopholis castelnaui Brenske, 1896
Leucopholis celebensis Brenske, 1892
Leucopholis cingulata Sharp, 1881
Leucopholis coneophora Burmeister
Leucopholis crassa Brenske, 1892
Leucopholis cretacea Burmeister, 1855
Leucopholis curvidens Brenske, 1896
Leucopholis deplanata Moser, 1908
Leucopholis elongata Brenske, 1892
Leucopholis emarginata Burmeister, 1855
Leucopholis fontainei Brenske, 1894
Leucopholis helleri Brenske, 1896
Leucopholis hirtiventris Frey, 1963
Leucopholis horni Brenske, 1900
Leucopholis insularis Brenske, 1896
Leucopholis irrorata (Chevrolat, 1841)
Leucopholis lepidophora Blanchard, 1851
Leucopholis mirabilis Moser, 1908
Leucopholis molitor Burmeister, 1855
Leucopholis niasiana Brenske, 1893
Leucopholis nigra Brenske, 1892
Leucopholis nudiventris Burmeister, 1855
Leucopholis nummicudens Newman, 1838
Leucopholis palembangia Brenske, 1896
Leucopholis pangiena Brenske, 1892
Leucopholis peguana Moser, 1918
Leucopholis pinguis Burmeister, 1855
Leucopholis plagiata Blanchard, 1851
Leucopholis pollens Sharp, 1876
Leucopholis proxima Brenske, 1894
Leucopholis pulverulenta Burmeister
Leucopholis reflexa Moser, 1924
Leucopholis rorida (Fabricius, 1801)
Leucopholis rufa Brenske, 1892
Leucopholis schochi Brenske, 1894
Leucopholis selenkana Brenske, 1896
Leucopholis semperi Brenske, 1896
Leucopholis shangirana Brenske, 1894
Leucopholis sharpi Brenske, 1896
Leucopholis staudingeri Brenske, 1892
Leucopholis sumatrensis Brenske, 1892
Leucopholis talaurensis Moser, 1913
Leucopholis tetaranus Brenske, 1896
Leucopholis tristicula Brenske, 1896
Leucopholis tristis Brenske, 1892

References

Melolonthinae
Scarabaeidae genera